Otto Marischka (31 May 1912 – 10 January 1991) was an Austrian international footballer.

References

1912 births
1991 deaths
Association football defenders
Austrian footballers
Germany international footballers
German footballers